Tetanolita borgesalis is a litter moth of the family Erebidae first described by Francis Walker in 1859. It is found in South America, including the French Antilles and Brazil.

References

Herminiinae
Moths described in 1859